Lieutenant General Sir John (Dane) Woodall KCMG KBE CB MC (1897−7 May 1985) was General Officer Commanding Northern Ireland District.

Military career
After attending the Royal Military Academy, Woolwich, Woodall was commissioned into the Royal Garrison Artillery in July 1915. In  World War I, he served in Gallipoli and was a Staff Captain in Salonika and the Black Sea. He was awarded the Military Cross in June 1917.

After the War he became Deputy Assistant Adjutant General for the Black Sea Area before undertaking the same role in Turkey. He attended the Staff College, Camberley in 1930 and in 1937 he became an instructor in Gunnery at Northern Command and in 1932 he transferred to become a Staff Officer, Royal Artillery at Western Command. He then went on to be Brigade Major for the Royal Artillery in Malaya in 1934 and then an instructor at the RAF Staff College in 1938.

He served in World War II initially as a General Staff Officer with the British Expeditionary Force and then as a Brigadier on the General Staff. He was appointed a Regimental Commander in the Royal Artillery in 1943 and Senior Air Staff Officer at RAF Army Cooperation Command in 1943 before becoming Deputy Director of Staff Duties at the War Office in 1944. During his time working with the Royal Air Force he co-authored the "Wane-Woodall Report" which advocated a specially trained and equipped unit for close support, a series of liaison officers, a command post and a communications system.

After the Second World War he was appointed Director of Manpower at the War Office before moving on to be Vice Adjutant-General to the Forces in 1949. He became General Officer Commanding (GOC) Northern Ireland in 1952 and Governor and Commander-in-Chief of Bermuda in 1955.

References

External links
Generals of World War II

1897 births
1985 deaths
Graduates of the Royal Military Academy, Woolwich
Graduates of the Staff College, Camberley
British Army lieutenant generals
British Army brigadiers of World War II
Governors of Bermuda
Royal Artillery officers
Knights Commander of the Order of St Michael and St George
Knights Commander of the Order of the British Empire
Companions of the Order of the Bath
Recipients of the Military Cross
British Army personnel of World War I